The ITV Diamant (Diamond) is a French single-place, paraglider that was designed by Xavier Demoury and produced by ITV Parapentes of Épagny, Haute-Savoie. It is now out of production.

Design and development
The Diamant was designed as an intermediate sport glider. The models are each named for their approximate wing area in square metres.

Variants
Diamant 25
The glider model is IA certified.
Diamant 28
Mid-sized model for medium-weight pilots. The glider model is IA certified.
Diamant 31
Large-sized model for heavier pilots. The glider model is IA certified.

Specifications (Diamant 28)

References

Diamant
Paragliders